Trade beads are beads that were used as a medium of barter within and amongst communities. They are considered to be one of the earliest forms of trade between members of the human race. It has also been surmised that bead trading was one of the reasons why humans developed language.

Slave beads

In the 16th Century continental North America, trade beads (sometimes called aggry and slave beads) were otherwise decorative glass beads used as a token money to exchange for goods, services and slaves (hence the name). The beads were integrated in Native American jewelry using various beadwork techniques. Trade beads were also used by early Europeans to purchase African resources,  including African slave trade. Aggry beads are a particular type of decorated glass bead from Ghana. The practice continued till the early 20th century.

History
Made to ease the passage of European explorers and then traders mainly across the African continent, the beads were made throughout Europe although the Venetians dominated production. Archaeologists documented in 2022 that beads manufactured in Europe continued to accompany exploration of Africa using Indigenous routes into the interior as recently as the late-nineteenth century.

Trade beads are also found in the United States and Canada, and throughout Latin America. The bead designs were varied.  North American Indians sought beads of particular color, size, and form.  The frequency of archaeological discovery of each type indicates their popularity.  Large blue beads were favoured early in the trade although details of when European trade with native American Indians began remains elusive.

It was reported in February 2022 that Venetian glass trade beads had been found at three prehistoric Eskimo sites in Alaska, including Punyik Point. Uninhabited today, and located a mile from the Continental Divide in the Brooks Range, the area was on ancient trade routes from the Bering Sea to the Arctic Ocean. From their creation in Venice, Italy, researchers believe the likely route these artifacts traveled was across Europe, then Eurasia and finally over the Bering Strait, making this discovery "the first documented instance of the presence of indubitable European materials in prehistoric sites in the western hemisphere as the result of overland transport across the Eurasian continent." After radiocarbon dating materials found near the beads, archaeologists estimated their arrival on the continent to sometime between 1440 and 1480, predating Christopher Columbus.  The dating and provenance has been challenged by other researchers who point out that such beads were not made in Venice until the mid-sixteenth century and that an early seventeenth century French origin is possible.

The production of slave (trade) beads became so popular that literally tons of these beads were used for this purpose. Beads were used as ballast in slave/trade ships for the outbound trip.  The beads and other trade items were exchanged for human cargo as well as ivory, gold, and other goods desired in Europe and around the world.  The beads traded were not of a set design, but were produced according to demand. Millefiori (thousand flower) beads from Venice, Italy were one of the most commonly traded beads, and are commonly known as "African trade beads."  They were produced by creating flowers or stripes from glass canes, that were then cut and moulded onto a core of solid color. Beads such as the kiffa beads of Mauritania are thought to have resulted from women creating powdered glass beads to mimic the appearance of millefiori beads.

The success of this form of currency can largely be attributed to the work required to produce them locally (i.e. scarcity) and salability across space.  The ease of production of these beads using methods employed by European artisans enabled exploitation via a speculative attack on this West African monetary system.  Glassmaking was not common in Africa.  Africans often used beads for currency and wealth storage, and social status could be easily determined by the quality, quantity and style of jewellery worn.  This created a high demand for trade beads in Africa.

See also

Ancient glass trade
History of glass in sub-Saharan Africa
History of money
List of historical currencies

References

External links
 

Beadwork
Collecting
Glass art
Modern obsolete currencies
Slave trade
Exonumia